The 1919 Schwarzburg-Sondershausen state election was held on 26 January 1919 to elect the 16 members of the Landtag of Schwarzburg-Sondershausen.

Results

References 

Schwarzburg-Sondershausen
Elections in Thuringia